Ovosodo (from Ovosodo, a quarter in the historic center of Livorno, the city where the story takes place), also known as Hardboiled Egg, is a 1997 Italian comedy film, written and directed by Paolo Virzì.

Cast
Edoardo Gabbriellini: Piero Mansani
Nicoletta Braschi: prof. Giovanna Fornari
Claudia Pandolfi: Susy Susini
Marco Cocci: Tommaso Paladini
Regina Orioli: Lisa
Barbara Scoppa: mother of Piero
Paolo Ruffini: Gargani

See also  
 List of Italian films of 1997

References

External links
 
 

1997 films
Italian comedy films
Venice Grand Jury Prize winners
Films directed by Paolo Virzì
Films set in Livorno
1997 comedy films
1990s Italian films